Momente (German for "moments") is the tenth studio album from Austrian band L'Âme Immortelle.

Track listing

L'Âme Immortelle albums